Gregory Go Boom is a 2013 comedy drama short film, written and directed by Janicza Bravo. The film premiered at Jash during YouTube Comedy Week on May 23, 2013.

The film later screened at 2014 Sundance Film Festival on January 17, 2014. It won the Grand Jury Prize for Narrative Short at the festival.

Plot
Gregory, a paraplegic man tries dating for the first time and discovered that life is very different than he had imagined.

Cast
Michael Cera as Gregory
Brett Gelman as Tom
Sarah Burns as Rose
Anna Rose Hopkins as Summer / Cheyenne
Stephanie Allynne as Willie
Mireya Lucio as Crystal
Nick Ortega as Carlos
Holly Kaplan as Waitress

Reception
Gregory Go Boom received mostly positive reviews from critics. Liana Maeby of HitFix praised Cera and the film by saying that Gregory is a good little short that's worth watching simply to see Michael Cera play a character that looks like "Napoleon Dynamite crossed with Yertle the Turtle." Derek Deskins of Lonely Reviewer, praised the film by saying that Gregory Go Boom is an interestingly dark and ominous short that will make you view Michael Cera completely differently."

Accolades

References

External links
 

2013 films
2013 comedy-drama films
American comedy-drama films
American drama short films
Films about paraplegics or quadriplegics
Sundance Film Festival award winners
2013 short films
2010s English-language films
2010s American films